Lake Frederick is an unincorporated community located in Frederick County, Virginia. The primary geographic feature is a 117-acre lake impoundment owned by the Virginia Department of Game and Inland Fisheries. Shea Homes, Ryan Homes, and Van Metre Homes have constructed communities along the lakeside.

References

Frederick